Donald James Nicholls, Baron Nicholls of Birkenhead,  (25 January 1933 – 25 September 2019) was a British barrister who became a Law Lord (Lord of Appeal in Ordinary).

Biography
Nicholls was educated at Birkenhead School, before reading Law at Liverpool University and Trinity Hall, Cambridge. He was called to the bar in 1958 as a member of the Middle Temple, becoming a Queen's Counsel in 1974. He was made a High Court judge on 30 September 1983, receiving the customary knighthood. On 10 February 1986, he was appointed a Lord Justice of Appeal and subsequently appointed to the Privy Council. He became Vice-Chancellor of the Supreme Court on 1 October 1991. He was appointed a Lord of Appeal in Ordinary on 3 October 1994 and consequently created a life peer as Baron Nicholls of Birkenhead, of Stoke d'Abernon in the County of Surrey.

In 1998, Nicholls and the other Law Lords came to the international fore in deciding whether Augusto Pinochet could be extradited to Spain. Three lords, including Nicholls, rejected the argument that Pinochet was immune from arrest and prosecution for his acts as Head of State in Chile. They said the State Immunity Act 1978 flouted a battery of international legislation on human rights abuses to which Britain is a signatory, and secondly, it would have meant endorsing the arguments of Pinochet's legal team that British law would have protected even Adolf Hitler. Nicholls said, 

He became Second Senior Law Lord on 1 October 2002, and retired in 2007, succeeded by Lord Hoffmann.

From 1998 to 2004, he was a Non-Permanent Judge of the Hong Kong Court of Final Appeal.

He retired from the membership of the House of Lords on 3 April 2017.

He died on 25 September 2019 at the age of 86.

Judgments
Harries v The Church Commissioners for England [1992] 1 WLR 1241
Royal Brunei Airlines Sdn Bhd v Tan [1995] 2 AC 378
Attorney General v Blake [2001] 1 AC 268
White v White [2001] 1 AC 596
Reynolds v Times Newspapers Ltd [2001] 2 AC 127
 Royal Bank of Scotland plc v Etridge [2001] UKHL 44
Fairchild v Glenhaven Funeral Services Ltd [2002] UKHL 22
Shogun Finance Ltd v Hudson [2003] UKHL 62
Tomlinson v Congleton Borough Council [2003] UKHL 47
Wilson v First County Trust Ltd [2003] UKHL 40
Bellinger v Bellinger [2003] UKHL 21
Campbell v Mirror Group Newspapers Ltd [2004] UKHL 22
A and others v Secretary of State for the Home Department [2004] UKHL 56
Archibald v Fife Council [2004] UKHL 32
Ghaidan v Godin-Mendoza [2004] 2 AC 557
Cream Holdings Ltd v Banerjee and the Liverpool Post and Echo Ltd [2004] UKHL 44
National Westminster Bank plc v Spectrum Plus Ltd [2005] UKHL 41
Gregg v Scott [2005] UKHL 2
Jackson v Royal Bank of Scotland [2005] UKHL 3
Jackson v Attorney General [2005] UKHL 56
R (Begum) v Governors of Denbigh High School [2006] UKHL 15
R v Saik [2006] UKHL 18 
OBG Ltd v Allan [2007] UKHL 21
Palk v Mortgage Services Funding plc [1993] Ch 330

Publications
Lord Nicholls, 'Trustees and their broader community: where duty, morality and ethics converge’ (1995) 9(3) Trusts Law International 71

Arms

See also
English law

References

1933 births
2019 deaths
People educated at Birkenhead School
English barristers
20th-century English judges
Knights Bachelor
Nicholls of Birkenhead 
Alumni of Trinity Hall, Cambridge
Alumni of the University of Liverpool
Members of the Privy Council of the United Kingdom
Chancery Division judges
Members of the Middle Temple
Members of the Judicial Committee of the Privy Council
21st-century English judges